Capital Disney was a British digital radio station aimed at 8 to 16 year olds which used to broadcast across the UK on DAB Digital Radio in selected areas. Capital Disney launched on 16 September 2002 as a joint venture between GCap Media PLC and The Walt Disney Company. It was also broadcast on Sky Digital, Tiscali TV, Virgin Media, and streaming online. The station announced on 14 May 2007 that it would close down on 29 June 2007.

Capital Disney was one of the first radio stations in the country to use the newly developed Digital radio (DAB) format to provide a radio station specifically aimed at children and teenagers. The station broadcast twenty four hours a day with a series of presenter and music led programming.

Background
In 1998 the Capital Radio Group announced plans to launch a kids-only format radio station, bidding for the North East England FM licence (which was won by Galaxy 105-106). Called Fun Radio it was to be a pop station aimed at 8-16 year olds. Despite this failure Capital still had hopes of launching this station, at the time a brand new format for an underserved audience.

The Cube
The station aired in 2001 under the name of Cube (the name originally chosen for Century London) in several regional areas of England and Wales with a purely new pop music format aimed at young teens. It was seen as a competitor to GWR Group's Core (radio station), which launched two years earlier. Because Cube was on DAB, at the time very few people listened to the service. Cube was noted for its high tempo music-driven formula, coupled with live DJs (A rarity for digital radio- most were voicetracked) and humorous and informative short clips in between the music (Such as 'How Does a Piano Work?') designed to create a learning environment, possibly to curb outside criticism that Cube was just a mindless music station. It shared studio space with Life and Century London and shared Kevin Palmer as the senior manager.

History
In February 2002, Disney announced a joint venture with Capital Radio to create and develop Capital Disney, replacing Cube. Capital Disney started broadcasting on 17 October 2002.

It was announced in May 2007 that Capital Disney would close down in June 2007 after five years airing. A statement on the Capital Disney website told that 'both parties (GCap Media and The Walt Disney Company) had agreed to pursue their interests individually.'

A number of petitions were started by fans of the station arguing against its closure but these were ultimately unsuccessful.

Capital Disney started to leave DAB multiplexes across the UK in June 2007, in most areas being replaced with Traffic Radio or XFM. The final DAB MUX to lose Capital Disney was London CE Digital, with Capital Disney being switched off shortly after 1pm on 29 June 2007. In an unintentional move, the final song played by Capital Disney on this DAB MUX was McFly with their cover of  Queen's Don't Stop Me Now.

Due to an operational freeze at Sky, Capital Disney remained on air until July 2007, however, with the original name of 'Cube', as the Walt Disney Company had agreed with GCap Media to only contract their name until June 2007.

The website remained for a short time after presenters were taken off air, but this also closed on the same day, replaced by a message and redirect to London's Capital Radio website.

13 years after Capital Disney’s closure, the American Radio Disney would later cease operations as well in early 2021.

The Playlist
Capital Disney played a range of chart music and new acts. Originally, talking story books could be heard often during school hours, but were replaced by non-stop music from 9am until 1pm and then a DJ, James Beckingham, from 1 to 4pm, under the name of "Daytime". They also played artists that didn't get any airplay on mainstream radio such as The Lovebites and album tracks from artists that appear on the playlist.

Overnight, Capital Disney played non-stop hits, however previously to this overnight was the home of non-stop chillout music. This ceased in 2003 and now this type of music can be heard on sister station Chill.

Presenters

The final line up of presenters at closure was Adam Morris, known on air as The General, James Beckingham, Matt James, Val Mellon, Leigh Purves, Nigel Mitchell, Andrew Rendle, known as Radio Rendle, Adam O'Neill, Saffron Oddy and Sophie Bruce. Previous presenters on the station have included Allan Lake, Tim Lichfield, known as Tiger Tim, Korry Denison, Andy Kench, Dan Marsh, Kelli Nelson, Will Chambers, Carl Carter and Gema Ensenat.

Awards
In 2004, the station won the NTL Digital Radio station of the year award.
In 2005, the station was nominated for and won the Sony Radio Academy award 'Digital Terrestrial Radio Station' of the year, against BBC 6 Music and BBC 7. The judges noted that,
"Capital Disney gave every appearance of filling a genuine gap in the market with a professional and entertaining service directly meeting the needs of an under-served audience."

In 2006, Capital Disney was nominated for the Sony Radio Academy 'Digital Terrestrial Radio Station Of The Year' award. Planet Rock, another GCap Media station, was presented with the award.  The judges noted that, "Capital Disney continues to be warm, funny and inventive without ever patronising its target audience. It was a station of great charm."

References

External links
 GCap Media PLC 

Defunct radio stations in the United Kingdom
Radio Disney
GCap Media
British brands
Former subsidiaries of The Walt Disney Company